Ernest Bernbaum (February 12, 1879 – March 8, 1958)
was an American educator, scholar, writer and an opponent of the Suffragette movement.

Born in Brooklyn, N.Y., the son of Ole Kruse Bernbaum and Dorothea (née Christiansen) Bernbaum, Ernest was educated at Brooklyn Polytechnic Institute. He attended Harvard University, where he was awarded a Ph.D. in philology in 1907. He taught English at Harvard from 1907–1916, then joined the staff of the University of Illinois. From 1917–1919, he was chair of the Committee on War Lectures at Illinois. In 1921 he married Ruth Guenther. He remained at the University of Illinois until 1945.

Bibliography
 Anthology of Romanticism and Guide Through the Romantic Movement (1929)
 Recent Works on Prose Fiction Before 1800 (1927)
 The Place of The Pilgrims in American History: The Puritan Pilgrim (1920)
 English Poets of the Eighteenth Century (1918)
 Editor, Anti-Suffrage Essays by Massachusetts Women (1916)
 The Drama of Sensibility: a Sketch of the History of English Sentimental Comedy and Domestic Tragedy, 1696-1780 (1915)
 The Mary Carleton Narratives, 1663-1673: a Missing Chapter in the History of the English Novel (1914)
 Mrs. Behn's Biography, a Fiction (1913)

References

External links

 
 
 
Papers, 1913-1915: A Finding Aid. Schlesinger Library, Radcliffe Institute, Harvard University.

1879 births
1958 deaths
Harvard Graduate School of Arts and Sciences alumni
Harvard University faculty
University of Illinois faculty
American male writers
Anti-suffragists
Polytechnic Institute of New York University alumni